Malignant narcissism is a psychological syndrome comprising an extreme mix of narcissism, antisocial behavior, aggression, and sadism. Grandiose, and always ready to raise hostility levels, the malignant narcissist undermines families and organizations in which they are involved, and dehumanizes the people with whom they associate.

Malignant narcissism is not a diagnostic category, but a subcategory of narcissism. Narcissistic personality disorder (NPD) is found in the Diagnostic and Statistical Manual of Mental Disorders (DSM-IV-TR), while malignant narcissism is not. Malignant narcissism could include aspects of narcissistic personality disorder (NPD) alongside a mix of antisocial, paranoid and sadistic personality disorder traits. The importance of malignant narcissism and of projection as a defense mechanism has been confirmed in paranoia, as well as "the patient's vulnerability to malignant narcissistic regression". A person with malignant narcissism exhibits paranoia in addition to the symptoms of a Narcissistic Personality Disorder. Because a malignant narcissist's personality cannot tolerate any criticism, being mocked typically causes paranoia.

History 
The social psychologist Erich Fromm first coined the term "malignant narcissism" in 1964, describing it as a "severe mental sickness" representing "the quintessence of evil". He characterized the condition as "the most severe pathology and the root of the most vicious destructiveness and inhumanity". Edith Weigert (1967) saw malignant narcissism as a "regressive escape from frustration by distortion and denial of reality", while Herbert Rosenfeld (1971) described it as "a disturbing form of narcissistic personality where grandiosity is built around aggression and the destructive aspects of the self become idealized."

On 11 May 1968, psychoanalyst Otto Kernberg presented his paper Factors in the psychoanalytic treatment of narcissistic personalities, from the work of the Psychotherapy Research Project of The Menninger Foundation, at the 55th Annual Meeting of the American Psychoanalytic Association in Boston. Kernberg's paper was first published in hard copy on 1 January 1970. In Kernberg's 1968 paper, first published in 1970 in the Journal of the American Psychoanalytic Association (JAPA), the word 'malignant' does not appear once, while 'pathological' or 'pathologically' appears 25 times.

Developing these ideas further, Kernberg pointed out that the antisocial personality was fundamentally narcissistic and without morality. Malignant narcissism includes a sadistic element creating, in essence, a sadistic psychopath. In his article, "malignant narcissism" and psychopathy are employed interchangeably. Kernberg first proposed malignant narcissism as a psychiatric diagnosis in 1984. So far it has not been accepted in any of the medical manuals, such as the ICD-10 or the DSM-5.

Kernberg described malignant narcissism as a syndrome characterized by a narcissistic personality disorder (NPD), antisocial features, paranoid traits, and egosyntonic aggression. Other symptoms may include an absence of conscience, a psychological need for power, and a sense of importance (grandiosity). Psychoanalyst George H. Pollock wrote in 1978: "The malignant narcissist is presented as pathologically grandiose, lacking in conscience and behavioral regulation with characteristic demonstrations of joyful cruelty and sadism". Of note, M. Scott Peck uses malignant narcissism as a way to explain evil.

Kernberg believed that malignant narcissism should be considered part of a spectrum of pathological narcissism, which he saw as ranging from Hervey M. Cleckley's antisocial character (what is now referred to as psychopathy or antisocial personality) at the high end of severity, through malignant narcissism, and then to narcissistic personality disorder at the low end. So according to Kernberg's hierarchy, psychopathy trumps malignant narcissism as a more extreme form of pathological narcissism. Malignant narcissism can be distinguished from psychopathy, according to Kernberg, because of the malignant narcissist's capacity to internalize "both aggressive and idealized superego precursors, leading to the idealization of the aggressive, sadistic features of the pathological grandiose self of these patients".

According to Kernberg, the psychopath's paranoid stance against external influences makes him or her unwilling to internalize even the values of the "aggressor", while malignant narcissists "have the capacity to admire powerful people, and can depend on sadistic and powerful but reliable parental images". Malignant narcissists, in contrast to psychopaths, are also said to be capable of developing "some identification with other powerful idealized figures as part of a cohesive 'gang'...which permits at least some loyalty and good object relations to be internalized... Some of them may present rationalized antisocial behavior – for example, as leaders of sadistic gangs or terrorist groups...with the capacity for loyalty to their own comrades."

Psychopathy and the dark triad 
The terms malignant narcissist and psychopath are sometimes used interchangeably because there is little to clinically separate the two. Individuals who have narcissistic personality disorder, malignant narcissism, and psychopathy all exhibit similar symptoms, as detailed in the Hare Psychopathy Checklist. The test consists of 20 items that are scored on a three-point scale, with a score of 0 indicating that it does not apply at all, 1 indicating a partial match or mixed information, and 2 indicating a reasonably good match. The cut-off for the label of psychopathy in the United States is 30 and in the United Kingdom is 25 out of a possible score of 40. High scores are associated with impulsivity and aggression, Machiavellianism, and persistent criminal behavior, but not with empathy and affiliation.

Malignant narcissism overlaps with the personality construct of the dark triad, first published by Delroy L. Paulhus and Kevin M. Williams in 2002, that describes three correlated non-pathological personality types: Machiavellianism, narcissism, and psychopathy. Some researchers have added sadism to the triad to create the dark tetrad. Psychologist Keith Campbell has defined malignant narcissism specifically as the dangerous combination of narcissism and sadism, which fortunately is rare. Malignant narcissism is highlighted as a key area in the study of mass murder, sexual sadism, and serial murder.

Contrast with narcissism 
The primary difference between narcissism and malignant narcissism is that malignant narcissism includes comorbid features of other personality disorders and thus consists of a broader range of symptoms than pathological narcissism (NPD). In the term "malignant narcissism", the word "malignant" is used in the sense of the word described by the Merriam-Webster Dictionary as "passionately and relentlessly malevolent, aggressively malicious". In malignant narcissism, NPD is accompanied by additional symptoms of antisocial, paranoid and sadistic personality disorders. While a person with NPD will deliberately damage other people in pursuit of their own selfish desires, they may regret and will in some circumstances show remorse for doing so. Because traits of antisocial personality disorder are present in malignant narcissism, the "malignant narcissist" has a more pervasive lack of empathy than someone with NPD alone and will lack feelings of guilt or remorse for the damage they cause. Since sadism is often considered a feature of malignant narcissism, an individual with the syndrome may not only lack feelings of guilt or remorse for hurting others but may even derive pleasure from the gratuitous infliction of mental or physical pain on others. These traits were formerly codified in the DSM-III under sadistic personality disorder (SPD).

Therapy 

Typically in the analysis of the malignant narcissist, "the patient attempts to triumph over the analyst by destroying the analysis and himself or herself"—an extreme version of what Jacques Lacan described as "that resistance of the amour-propre... which is often expressed thus: 'I can't bear the thought of being freed by anyone other than myself'".

Since Malignant Narcissism is a severe personality disorder that has far-reaching societal and familial effects, it requires attention from both the psychiatric community and the social science community. Treatment is recommended in a therapeutic community, as well as a psychoeducational preventative program aimed at both mental health professionals and the general public.

See also 

 Borderline personality disorder
 Narcissistic abuse
 Narcissistic leadership
 Narcissistic rage and narcissistic injury
 Narcissistic supply
 Vulnerable narcissism 
 The Mask of Sanity

References

External links 
 Narcissism and co-morbidity with other disorders

Problem behavior
Narcissism
Anti-social behaviour